Preprotachykinins are precursor proteins that are modified into tachykinin peptides. Via alternative splicing and post-translational modifications, preprotachykinins produce multiple peptide neurotransmitters.

There are two human preprotachykinins:
 preprotachykinin-1 (also PPT-1, PPT-I, or PPT-A), which produces substance P and neurokinin A (also called "substance K"), and the derived neuropeptide K and neurokinin gamma. 
 preprotachykinin-2 (also PPT-2, PPT-II, or PPT-B), which produces neurokinin B.

References 

Neuropeptides
Precursor proteins